Doctor Therne is a 1898 novel by H. Rider Haggard, about a smallpox epidemic that sweeps England, which was written as an attack upon the anti-vaccinationist movement of the time.

References

External links
Complete book at Project Gutenberg
Images and bibliographic information for various editions of Dr. Therne at SouthAfricaBooks.com

Novels by H. Rider Haggard
1898 British novels
1898 science fiction novels
British science fiction novels